Olivier Yohan Dacourt (born 25 September 1974) is a French former professional footballer who played as a midfielder. He is also a former French international and is best known for his spells at English side Leeds United and Italian clubs Roma and Inter Milan.

Club career

Early career
Dacourt was born in Montreuil, Seine-Saint-Denis. He made his debut in Division 1 with Strasbourg on 20 March 1993 in an away game with Auxerre, which Strasbourg lost 2–0. On 24 May 1997, he scored his first Ligue 1 goal for Strasbourg in an away match against Paris Saint-Germain, however, Strasbourg lost the match 2–1.

Dacourt transferred to Everton in 1998 and his debut game in the Premier League was a 0–0 draw against Aston Villa on 15 August 1998. On 23 September 1998, he scored his first goal in a League Cup tie against Huddersfield Town. Dacourt became a fan favourite with the Everton supporters, but was booed at the club's final home game of the season in May 1999 against West Ham after comments in a French article that he was unhappy at the club and looking to leave in the summer.

Dacourt returned to France after one season at Everton playing for RC Lens, where he impressed and earned a multimillion-pound move back to the Premier League to the Yorkshire club Leeds United.

Leeds United
Dacourt joined Leeds United from Lens in a £7.2 million move in 2000, and broke Leeds' transfer record at the time. He proved to be an instant hero at Elland Road with his tenacious style and ball winning play. His time at Leeds saw them reach the Champions League semi finals and also finishing in the top 4 of the Premier League. He was a regular in centre midfield under manager David O'Leary, mainly partnering David Batty in Leeds' midfield. His form at Leeds also saw Dacourt become a regular for the French national side. But after the sacking of O'Leary, his replacement Terry Venables dropped Dacourt from the Leeds team and favoured players like Paul Okon ahead of him.

Venables had a public falling out with Dacourt, in which Venables claimed he 'would personally drive Dacourt' away from the club. With Leeds' financial problems Dacourt was loaned out to Roma, and during his time out on loan Venables was sacked and replaced by Peter Reid with many believing Dacourt would return, but during the summer his loan move to Roma was made permanent. Dacourt proclaimed that he would like to return to Leeds one day in the future after playing in his former teammate Lucas Radebe's testimonial.

Roma and Inter Milan
Dacourt joined Roma on loan, with an option to purchase for £4 million. He signed a contract worth €1.85 million in gross. On 10 July 2003, Roma agreed to sign Dacourt outright for a new price: €5 million. Dacourt signed a 3-year contract, worth €4 million in gross each season. After being on the losing side in the Coppa Italia final against Inter Milan in 2005–06, Dacourt joined the club from Roma on a two-year contract in accordance with the Bosman ruling.

Originally signed as a backup player for Inter Milan, he became a key player of the league victory, in light of all the injuries to Patrick Vieira. On 2 December 2007, against Fiorentina, he damaged his left knee, with a torn cruciate ligament and damage to two other ligaments in it. He was expected to be out for the rest of the 2007–08 season.

In the 2008–09 season after recovering from injury, Dacourt did not feature as regularly and was not in Inter manager José Mourinho's plans.

Fulham and Standard Liège
On 2 February 2009, Dacourt joined English side Fulham on loan until the end of the 2008–09 season after being signed by Roy Hodgson. However, he had to settle for being confined to mainly substitute appearances due to the impressive form of Fulham's midfield and also Dacourt picking up some injury niggles, Dacourt's move to Fulham was not made permanent come the summer, Dacourt briefly returned to Inter where his contract then expired and he became a free agent.

Dacourt signed a one-year contract with Standard Liège on 23 September 2009. He was brought in to replace Steven Defour who had an injury on his foot and should be inactive for three months, Defour was the central midfield partner to Axel Witsel. On 8 February 2010, Standard Liège declared the end of his contract.

International career
Dacourt played for France at the 1996 Summer Olympics.

After impressing for Leeds United, his first senior appearance with the national team came against hosts South Korea in a match in the FIFA Confederations Cup in 2001, which France won 0–5, as they went on to win the tournament. He was a member of the French team that won the 2003 FIFA Confederations Cup and also appeared at UEFA Euro 2004.

International goals
(France score listed first, score column indicates score after each Dacourt goal)

Personal life
He is the brother-in-law of fellow footballer Norman Sylla.

Honours
Strasbourg
UEFA Intertoto Cup: 1995
Coupe de la Ligue: 1996–97

Inter Milan
Serie A: 2006–07, 2007–08
Supercoppa Italiana: 2006, 2008

France
FIFA Confederations Cup: 2001, 2003

References

External links
French Profile and pictures of Olivier Dacourt

1974 births
Living people
Sportspeople from Montreuil, Seine-Saint-Denis
French footballers
France under-21 international footballers
France international footballers
Association football midfielders
RC Strasbourg Alsace players
Everton F.C. players
RC Lens players
Leeds United F.C. players
A.S. Roma players
Inter Milan players
Fulham F.C. players
Standard Liège players
Ligue 1 players
Premier League players
Serie A players
Belgian Pro League players
2001 FIFA Confederations Cup players
2003 FIFA Confederations Cup players
UEFA Euro 2004 players
FIFA Confederations Cup-winning players
Olympic footballers of France
Footballers at the 1996 Summer Olympics
French expatriate footballers
Expatriate footballers in Belgium
Expatriate footballers in England
Expatriate footballers in Italy
French expatriate sportspeople in Belgium
French expatriate sportspeople in England
French expatriate sportspeople in Italy
Black French sportspeople
French people of Guadeloupean descent
Footballers from Seine-Saint-Denis